Aldin Skenderovic (born 28 June 1997) is a Luxembourger international footballer who plays club football for F91 Dudelange, as a defender.

Career
Skenderovic has played club football for FC Differdange 03, Union Titus Pétange and Progrès Niederkorn.

He made his international debut for Luxembourg in 2017.

Personal life
Skenderovic is a Bosniak of Montenegrin descent.

References

External links

Profile at SV Elversberg

1997 births
Living people
Luxembourgian footballers
Luxembourg international footballers
Luxembourgian people of Montenegrin descent
Bosniaks of Montenegro
Association football defenders
FC Differdange 03 players